Canal Road East, Canal Road West and the Canal Road Flyover are important roads in the Wan Chai District of Hong Kong Island, between the areas of East Point near Causeway Bay, and Morrison Hill near Wan Chai.

History
Before urban development, the area was the estuary of the Wong Nai Chung river, which flowed through Happy Valley. The 4th Governor of Hong Kong, John Bowring, developed the estuary area and named it  (or Bowring City).

 was built during the mid to late 1850s, fed by Wong Nai Chung. Because the long and narrow canal resembled the neck of a goose it was known as Ngo Keng Kan. It was used by small vessels that could pass under various bridges along the route. The surrounding area, Bowrington, is also known as Ngo Keng.

The original wooden bridge was replaced by an iron one that opened in March 1892. 
During the reclamation from 1922 to 1929 that created modern Wan Chai (the Praya East Reclamation Scheme) a wider bridge (100 foot width) was built with a double line of tram tracks.

The canal was covered and made subterranean in the 1970s when the Canal Road Flyover was built. However, the name survives for the area.

Canal Road Flyover
 was built in the 1970s for the Cross-Harbour Tunnel, between Canal Road East and Canal Road West.  Many who do not know the history of Canal Road might associate the flyover with Ngo Keng Kiu. It initially connected only Canal Road West to the north of Gloucester Road when it opened on 29 March 1972. Four years later, the flyover was expanded and extended south to the portal of Aberdeen Tunnel in Happy Valley (the extension is separately named ).

Peter Hines was the Resident Civil Engineer for the building of Happy Valley’s multiple-curves, 4-lane-wide, 40-span-long viaduct, and roads – and responsible for the opening in late 1980. He had warned that the wide, sloping roads would flood rain into the Happy Valley Racecourse and harbour tunnel, requiring flood tanks hidden under the racecourse.

The flyover was expanded again and an exit connected to Canal Road East.

The flyovers currently connects Aberdeen Tunnel to the Cross-Harbour Tunnel. They are a very important thoroughfare to conveniently reach Southern District and Happy Valley.

The area under this flyover was once visited by the second installment of Canadian television reality competition series, The Amazing Race Canada, where the U-Turn of the third leg was located.

Villain hitting
The area under the Canal Road Flyover, adjacent to Hennessy Road, is known for the old ladies who offer villain hitting services, in which personal enemies are cursed by beating pieces of paper representing them.  The practice is especially popular during king chat (ging jat) (typically in March).

See also
List of streets and roads in Hong Kong

References

External links

Canal Road and Ngo Keng Kiu (in Chinese)
Places named after British officials
John Bowring

Route 1 (Hong Kong)
Wan Chai
Ngo Keng Kiu
Roads on Hong Kong Island